This is a list of seasons played by Sporting de Gijón in Spanish and European football, from 1916 to the most recent completed season. It details the club's achievements in major competitions, and the top scorers in league games for each season.

The club was runner-up of the Liga one time, of the Spanish Cup two times and played the UEFA Cup six times.

Key

Key to league record:
 Pos = Final position
 Pld = Matches played
 W = Matches won
 D = Matches drawn
 L = Matches lost
 GF = Goals for
 GA = Goals against
 Pts = Points

Key to playoffs record:
 PP = Promotion playoffs
 RP = Relegation playoffs
 → = Remained in the same category
 ↑ = Promoted
 ↓ = Relegated

Key to rounds:
 W = Winner
 RU = Runner-up
 SF = Semi-finals
 QF = Quarter-finals
 R16 = Round of 16
 R32 = Round of 32
 R64 = Round of 64

 6R = Sixth round
 5R = Fifth round
 4R = Fourth round
 3R = Third round
 2R = Second round
 1R = First round
 GS = Group stage

Seasons

References

External links
Profile at BDFútbol
Profile at Futbolme

Seasons
 
Sporting Gijon
Seasons